Countess Claudine Susanna Rhédey von Kis-Rhéde (21 September 18121 October 1841) was the Hungarian wife of Duke Alexander of Württemberg. Her son, Francis, Duke of Teck, was the father of Mary of Teck, queen consort to George V of the United Kingdom. The current British monarch, Charles III, is Claudine's great-great-great-grandson.

Life
The Countess was born on her family estate,  in Sankt Georgen auf der Heide, Transylvania (then part of the Austrian Empire, today Sângeorgiu de Pădure, Romania) to Count László Rhédey de Kis-Rhéde (29 September 1775 – 22 November 1833) and his wife, Baroness Ágnes Inczédy de Nagy-Várad (ca. 1788 – ca. 1856). Most notable member of her family was Ferenc Rhédey, the reigning Prince of Transylvania who ruled Principality of Transylvania between 1657 and 1658. At birth, she was styled as Countess Klaudina (Claudine) Rhédey de Kis-Rhéde.

In 1835, she married Duke Alexander of Württemberg, youngest child and the only son of Duke Louis of Württemberg (younger brother of King Frederick I of Württemberg) and his wife, Princess Henriette of Nassau-Weilburg. Due to the German laws relating to the line of succession, she was viewed as being of non-royal rank and the marriage was declared morganatic. She was denied the title of Duchess, but was created Countess von Hohenstein by Ferdinand I of Austria on 16 May 1835, shortly after her marriage.

Claudine died in Austria in 1841 after being thrown from her horse. The remains of the Countess were originally interred in the Rhédey Mausoleum, but were subsequently removed and placed in the family crypt in the Reformed Church of Sângeorgiu de Pădure.

Issue
Countess Claudine Rhédey von Kis-Rhéde and Countess von Hohenstein had three children with Duke Alexander of Württemberg:
 Princess Claudine of Teck (1836–1894).
 Prince Francis of Teck (1837–1900); later created 1st Duke of Teck by Charles I of  Württemberg; married, on 12 June 1866 at St. Anne's Church, Kew, Surrey, West London, Princess Mary Adelaide of Cambridge, and had issue. He was granted the style of Highness by Queen Victoria on 1 July 1887, as a gift to celebrate her Golden Jubilee.
 Princess Victoria Mary "May" of Teck (1867–1953); later Queen Mary, queen consort of the United Kingdom.
 Prince Adolphus of Teck (1868–1927); later Duke of Teck and Marquess of Cambridge.
 Prince Francis of Teck (1870–1910).
 Prince Alexander of Teck (1874–1957); later Earl of Athlone.
 Countess Amalie of Hohenstein (1838–1893); married, on 24 October 1863 Baron (later Count) Paul von Hügel (1835–1897). They lived in Castle Reinthal, near Graz.
 Paul-Julius, Graf von Hügel (1872–1912); married, Anna Pauline Homolatsch.
 Huberta Amelia Maximilienne Pauline, Gräfin von Hügel (1897–1912)
 Ferdinand Paul, Graf von Hügel (b. 1901)

All children were initially styled as Counts or Countesses von Hohenstein, taking their titles from their mother. However, in 1863, the children were created Princes and Princesses of Teck by William I of Württemberg, with the style Serene Highness in the Kingdom of Württemberg.

Descendants
Prince Francis of Teck was later created Duke of Teck. He married Princess Mary Adelaide of Cambridge, a granddaughter of George III and became a member of the British Royal Family. His only daughter, Mary of Teck, married Prince George, Duke of York in July 1893, becoming queen consort on her husband's accession to the throne in May 1910. The current British monarch, Charles III, is Mary's great-grandson and thus Claudine's great-great-great-grandson.

Ancestors
The Rhédey family has been known from the 13th century. It is one of the Hungarian noble families descending from the house of Aba. The most notable ancestor of the Aba noble house was Samuel Aba, the third king of Hungary between 1041 and 1044, married to a sister of St. Stephen I, the first Roman Catholic (or Eastern Orthodox depending on view from the Great Schism of 1054) king of Hungary.

On her mother's side, Countess Claudine Rhédey von Kis-Rhéde, she is distantly related to Vlad the Monk, the brother of the infamous Vlad Dracula, the inspiration for the character Count Dracula.

See also
 Mary of Teck
 Aba (family)
 Family tree of the British royal family

References

Sources
 Siebmachers Wappenbuch Die Wappen des Adels von Ungarn
 Romániai Magyar Irodalmi Lexikon, Szépirodalom, Közírás, Tudományos Irodalom, Művelődés, III KH–M Kriterion Könyvkiadó, Bukarest 1994, 
 MARY, 1867–1953, Queen Consort of George V of the United Kingdom, The Columbia Encyclopedia, Sixth Edition Copyright© 2004, Columbia University Press.
 Korai Magyar Történeti Lexikon főszerkesztő: Kristó, Gyula, szerkesztők: Engel, Pál és Makk, Ferenc (Akadémiai Kiadó, Budapest, 1994)
 Kristó, Gyula - Makk, Ferenc: Az Árpád-ház uralkodói (IPC Könyvek, 1996)
 Das Haus Württemberg - Ein Biographisches Lexikon, Kohlhammer Verlag Stuttgart (1997) 

1812 births
1841 deaths
Claudine
People from Mureș County
Claudine
Hungarian countesses
Morganatic spouses of German royalty
Austrian countesses
Hungarian nobility in Transylvania
Accidental deaths in Austria